Ulla Jensen is a Danish rower. In the 1990 World Rowing Championships, she won a gold medal in the women's lightweight double sculls event. She also won a bronze medal in the same event in the 1991 World Rowing Championships.

References

See also

Danish female rowers
World Rowing Championships medalists for Denmark
Year of birth missing (living people)
Living people